Heaps Rock is a rock exposure above Bursey Icefalls and  west-northwest of Hutt Peak on the Mount Bursey massif, in Marie Byrd Land, Antarctica. It was mapped by the United States Geological Survey from ground surveys and U.S. Navy air photos, 1959–66, and was named by the Advisory Committee on Antarctic Names for Kenneth L. Heaps, a meteorologist at South Pole Station in 1970.

References

Rock formations of Marie Byrd Land
Flood Range